Gundar River flows through Madurai, Virudhunagar and Ramanathapuram districts of the Indian state of Tamil Nadu. The origin of Gundar is Sathuragiri hills, and it flows through Tirumangalam, Kamuthi and ends itself into Gulf of Mannar.

References 
 http://www.nellai.tn.nic.in/general.html#rivers

See also 
 List of rivers of Tamil Nadu

Rivers of Tamil Nadu
Geography of Tirunelveli district
Rivers of India